Samuel Swett Green (February 20, 1837 – December 8, 1918) was a founding figure in America’s public library movement.

Considered by many to be the "father of reference work", laying the groundwork for widespread reform within the field, he opened his presidential address to the American Library Association in 1891 with the memorable words "The function of the library is to serve its users".

Life 
Green was born in Worcester, Massachusetts, to the apothecary James Green and Elizabeth Swett. He was educated at Harvard, graduating in 1858. A few years later he attended Harvard Divinity School but did not graduate until 1864 due to health issues. Forsaking the ministry, he began his library career in 1867, when he was appointed director of the Worcester Free Public Library. The library was, in fact, heavily funded by Green’s uncle, Dr. John Green, who built an impressive collection before his death. As director, Green focused primarily on the technical aspects of librarianship, such as proper techniques in cataloging. He also instituted an interlibrary loan system and a lending collection of artwork in the role. In 1871 he took up the position of librarian, a position he held for thirty-eight years, and began introducing changes which would, eventually, be replicated in many other libraries throughout the country. For instance, the Free Library became the first public library in New England to remain open on Sundays.

Green was elected a member of the American Antiquarian Society in 1880.

Philosophy of librarianship 
In 1876, Green penned his highly influential article, "Personal Relations between Librarians and Readers", which appeared in that year's American Library Journal (later known simply as Library Journal). He also presented this work at the 1876 Centennial Conference. Green stated that reference librarians should have four goals: teaching patrons about the library's functions and resources, as well as how to utilize them; answering patrons' questions; helping patrons select good reading material; and promoting the library to the greater community. In other words, the library has a duty to the community it serves and must respond to the needs of its patrons. To Green, people ought to feel welcome in their local libraries and librarians should facilitate this by being actively engaged with patrons and personalizing their service for each individual.

Green writes, "A librarian should be as unwilling to allow an inquirer to leave the library with his question unanswered as a shopkeeper is to have his customer go out of his store without making a purchase." He also encouraged objectivity in addressing patrons' queries, instructing librarians to "avoid religiously the practice of cramming the minds of young inquirers with one-sided views regarding questions in dispute." While librarians should do everything they can to assist their patrons, Green also warned against making these patrons too dependent. Librarians should function, in part, as teachers, helping people gain the skills needed to locate information for themselves.

As another member of the Conference noted, "I wish his paper could be read by every librarian and every library director in the country. A librarian should be much more than a keeper of books; he should be an educator." Green's views garnered much attention throughout the library world and generated discussion about the lack of courtesy displayed in many libraries. Indeed, many modern day librarians consider Green's article to be the primary catalyst in the creation of reference service.

Green was also an advocate of close cooperation between public libraries and schools. He firmly believed that students learned best when they had free access to a wide variety of materials and viewpoints. At the university level, Green encouraged librarians to make available volumes which would be of use to students in their classes and to set aside time for the purpose of reference instruction, in order to assist students in independent research. Outside of the university, the relationship between schools and libraries was no less important. Here, again, Green emphasized cooperation between teachers and librarians, suggesting that libraries choose proper books to supplement the curricula of local elementary and high schools. According to one scholar, "the school and the library are practically one enterprise…they interlock…each is imperfect and insufficient without the other."

Frequent contributor of sketches to the American Antiquarian Society and papers to the newly founded Library Journal, Green authored The Public Library Movement in the United States, 1853–1893. Sprinkled with humorous anecdotes and personal reminiscence, the work is an intimate account of the pioneer organizers of the library movement and a detailed record of its early conventions.

Remembered by friends as a confident, industrious man of small stature and genial disposition, Green attended every Library Association conference during his career, served on numerous committees, created and presented many scholarly papers, and was heavily involved in the local library community. As Green himself remarked, "[I had] done everything in my power to advance the library cause."

References

Further reading 

Bopp, Richard E. and Linda C. Smith. Reference and Information Services: An Introduction, 3d ed. Englewood, CO: Libraries Unlimited, 2001.
Green, Samuel Swett. “Personal Relations Between Librarians and Readers”. Library Journal, v. 1 (October 1876): 74-81
Green, Samuel Swett. Libraries and schools: Papers selected by Samuel S. Green. New York: F. Leypoldt, 1883.

 

1837 births
1918 deaths
American librarians
Harvard Divinity School alumni
Presidents of the American Library Association
Members of the American Antiquarian Society